Cowboy and the Prizefighter is a 1949 American Western Cinecolor film directed by Lewis D. Collins and written by Jerry Thomas. It is based on the comic strip Red Ryder by Fred Harman and Stephen Slesinger. The film stars Jim Bannon, Don Reynolds, Emmett Lynn, Marin Sais, Don Haggerty and Karen Randle. The film was released on December 15, 1949, by Eagle-Lion Films.

Plot
Red Ryder's life is saved by Steve Stevenson who wishes to avenge the death of his father who he believes was murdered. His father's death involved a scheme whereas a local challenger would be challenged by a travelling prizefighter with foul means used to obtain money from the bets. When the same scheme comes to Red Ryder's town, local villains use the fight to not only obtain money from betting, but to be used as a cover for a robbery.

Cast          
Jim Bannon as Red Ryder
Don Reynolds as Little Beaver 
Emmett Lynn as Buckskin Blodgett
Marin Sais as The Duchess
Don Haggerty as Steve Stevenson
Karen Randle as Sue Evans
John Hart as Mark Palmer
Lane Bradford as Deuce Sampson 
Marshall Reed as Bart Osborne
Forrest Taylor as Miles Stevenson
Frank Ellis as Sheriff
Bud Osborne as Ernie 
Lou Nova as Bull Mason

References

External links
 

1949 films
1940s English-language films
American Western (genre) films
1949 Western (genre) films
Eagle-Lion Films films
Films directed by Lewis D. Collins
Films scored by Raoul Kraushaar
Cinecolor films
1940s American films